William Norris (July 2, 1802 – January 5, 1867) was an American steam locomotive builder.  He founded the Norris Locomotive Works and through this company pioneered the use of the 4-2-0 (the Norris type) locomotive type in America during the 1840s.

In 1837, William Norris was elected as a member to the American Philosophical Society.

References

 American locomotive engineers. Retrieved February 9, 2005.

1802 births
1867 deaths
Locomotive builders and designers
American people in rail transportation
American railroad mechanical engineers
American railroad pioneers
19th-century American engineers
19th-century American businesspeople